West London Junction was a railway station on the London and Birmingham Railway and West London Railway. It opened on 27 May 1844 and closed on 1 September 1866. The station was relocated and reopened on 2 March 1863 and lasted 3 more years until final closure in 1866.

References

Former London and North Western Railway stations
Railway stations in Great Britain opened in 1844
Railway stations closed in 1866